Krasny Yar (Qyzyl jar) is a village (selo) in Akmola Region, in northern part of Kazakhstan. The KATO code is 111033100.

Demographics

Population 
Population:  (3913 males and 4439 females). As of 2009, the population of Krasny Yar was 9875 inhabitants (4704 males and 5171 females).

References

Notes

Populated places in Akmola Region